Ferdinand I (Spanish: Fernando I; 27 November 1380 – 2 April 1416 in Igualada, Òdena) named Ferdinand of Antequera and also the Just (or the Honest) was king of Aragon, Valencia, Majorca, Sardinia and (nominal) Corsica and king of Sicily, duke (nominal) of Athens and Neopatria, and count of Barcelona, Roussillon and Cerdanya (1412–1416). He was also regent of Castile (1406–1416).

Biography
Ferdinand was born 27 November 1380 in Medina del Campo, the younger son of King John I of Castile and Eleanor of Aragon.

On 15 August 1403 in Medina del Campo, Ferdinand founded a new order of knighthood, the Order of the Jar.

In 1406, upon the death of his elder brother, King Henry III of Castile, Ferdinand declined the Castilian crown and instead, with Henry's widow Catherine of Lancaster, became coregent during the minority of his nephew John II of Castile. In this capacity he distinguished himself by his prudent administration of domestic affairs.

In a war with the Muslim Kingdom of Granada, he conquered the town of Antequera (1410), whence his surname.

After Ferdinand's maternal uncle, King Martin I of Aragon (Martin II of Sicily), died without surviving legitimate issue, Ferdinand was chosen King of Aragon in 1412 to succeed him in the Compromise of Caspe. The other candidate, Count James II of Urgell (see Counts of Urgell), revolted and Ferdinand dissolved the County of Urgell in 1413.

Ferdinand created the title of Prince of Girona for the heir of the Crown of Aragon on 19 February 1416.

The most notable accomplishment of his brief reign was his agreement in 1416 to depose the Antipope Benedict XIII, thereby helping to end the Western Schism, which had divided the Roman Catholic Church for nearly 40 years.

He is buried in the Crown of Aragon's royal pantheon of the monastery of Poblet, in a magnificent tomb ordered by his son Alfonso to Pere Oller in 1417.

The Italian humanist Lorenzo Valla wrote an official biography of Ferdinand, Historiarum Ferdinandi regis Aragonum libri sex.

Family and children
In 1393 Ferdinand married Eleanor of Alburquerque (1374–1435). They had seven children:
 Alfonso V of Aragon (1396–1458), king of Aragon, Sicily and Naples, married Maria of Castile
 Maria of Aragon, (1403–1445), queen of Castile, first wife of John II of Castile
 John II of Aragon (1398–1479)
 Henry of Aragon (c. 1400-1445), duke of Villena, count of Alburquerque and Empuries, lord of Sogorb, etc. and grand master of the military Order of Santiago, married Catherine of Castile
 Eleanor of Aragon, (1402–1445), queen of Portugal, who married Edward I of Portugal
 Peter of Aragon (1406–1438), count of Alburquerque and duke of Noto
 Sancho of Aragon (c.1400–1416), grand master of the Orders of Calatrava and Alcántara

Appearance and character
"He was tall, a little more than average, and thin and ruddy, and his cheeks had a few freckles... very patient to all who wanted to talk to him, even if their speeches were ordinary or not well-reasoned..."

Genealogy

References

Bibliography

Further reading
T. N. Bisson, The Medieval Crown of Aragon.

External links

  Ferdinand I of Catalonia-Aragon in the Catalan Hyperencyclopaedia
  H. J. Chaytor, A History of Aragon and Catalonia, ch. 14, "The 'Compromise' of Caspe".
  La Monarquía Hispánica: Fernando I el de Antequera (1412-1416) (in Spanish)
  Article of Francesca Español Bertran on his tomb in Poblet (in Spanish)

1380 births
1416 deaths
15th-century Aragonese monarchs
15th-century Kings of Sicily
People from Medina del Campo
House of Trastámara
Monarchs of Majorca
Valencian monarchs
Counts of Barcelona
Castilian infantes
Regents of Castile
Burials at the Poblet Monastery
Counts of Malta